Slawiya, as-Slawiya ( Ṣ(a)lāwiya) was one of the three parts of the Rus' with the center in Holmgard (identified with the land of Ilmen Slavs) described in a lost book by Abu Zayd al-Balkhi (dating from c. 920) and mentioned in works by some of his followers (Ibn Hawqal, Al-Istakhri, Hudud ul-'alam). The two other centers were Arthaniya ( ’Arṯāniya) (not properly explained) & Kuyaba ( Kūyāba; usually identified with Kiev).

Slawiya is described as the most remote groups of the Rus', together with Kuyaba and Arthania they are involved in extensive international trade relations, in particular with the Muslim East. In Ibn Hawqal describing it is called primary in relation to the other two groups.

Modern historiography tends to identify as-Slawiya with the Novgorodian lands.

See also
Garðaríki ("the realm of towns")
Rus' Khaganate
Novgorod Republic
Kievan Rus'
Old Novgorod dialect

References 

History of the Rus' people
Former countries in Europe